Mauricio Manuel Guzmán (born 16 September 1999) is an Argentine professional (?) footballer who plays as a centre-back for Club Almagro on loan from Estudiantes.

Career
Guzmán started out in the youth ranks of local club Atlético Progreso, prior to signing for Estudiantes in 2016. After captaining the reserves, Guzmán made his breakthrough into first-team football in 2020. He was initially an unused substitute for a Primera División home loss to Racing Club on 9 March, before making his senior debut on 31 October in a goalless draw away to Aldosivi in the Copa de la Liga Profesional; he played the full match.

Career statistics
.

Notes

References

External links

1999 births
Living people
Sportspeople from Buenos Aires Province
Argentine footballers
Association football defenders
Estudiantes de La Plata footballers
Club Almagro players
Argentine Primera División players
Primera Nacional players